Barcza is a village in the administrative district of Gmina Masłów, Kielce County, Świętokrzyskie Voivodeship, in south-central Poland. 

Barcza may also refer to:
Barcza Opening, chess opening system
Barcza (surname)

See also